Shoalhaven Zoo, formerly the Nowra Animal Park, is an animal park on the South Coast of New South Wales, Australia.

Shoalhaven Zoo is the largest native animal park on the NSW South Coast and holds over 100 species of mostly native mammals, birds and reptiles.

List of animals

 African lion (including white coated)
 Agile wallaby
 Aldabra giant tortoise
 Asian water buffalo
 Australian king parrot
 Bare-nosed wombat
 Blue-winged kookaburra
 Brown capuchin monkey
 Buff-banded rail
 Bush stone-curlew
 Capybara
 Carpet python
 Centralian blue-tongued lizard
 Chestnut-breasted mannikin
 Common marmoset
 Common wallaroo
 Corn snake
 Crimson rosella
 Dingo (returning soon)
 Domestic goat
 Domestic goose
 Domestic horse
 Domestic pig
 Dromedary camel
 Eastern bearded dragon
 Eastern blue-tongued lizard
 Eastern grey kangaroo
 Eastern long-necked turtle
 Eastern rosella
 Eclectus parrot
 Elongated tortoise
 Emu
 Frilled lizard
 Galah
 Gouldian finch
 Guinea pig
 Indian peafowl
 Koala
 Lace monitor
 Laughing kookaburra
 Leopard tortoise
 Llama
 Major Mitchell's cockatoo
 Maned wolf
 Masked lapwing
 Meerkat
 Musk lorikeet
 Olive python
 Quokka
 Rabbit
 Rainbow lorikeet
 Red kangaroo
 Red-necked wallaby (including albino)
 Reticulated python (albino)
 Ridge-tailed monitor
 Saltwater crocodile
 Short-beaked echidna
 Southern cassowary
 Southern hairy-nosed wombat
 Spotted-tailed quoll
 Star finch
 Sulphur-crested cockatoo
 Swamp wallaby
 Western grey kangaroo
 White-browed woodswallow
 Yellow-tailed black cockatoo

References

External links 

City of Shoalhaven
Zoos in New South Wales
South Coast (New South Wales)